The 1927 Crimean earthquakes occurred in the month of June and again in September in the waters of the Black Sea near the Crimean Peninsula. Each of the submarine earthquakes in the sequence triggered tsunami. The June event was moderate relative to the large September 11 event, which had at least one aftershock that also generated a tsunami. Following the large September event, natural gas that was released from the sea floor created flames that were visible along the coastline, and was accompanied by bright flashes and explosions.

June 26 event 

The June shock was a strong event with a magnitude of 6.0 that caused a nondestructive tsunami along the coast. The shock's intensity was gauged to be VII–VIII (Very strong–Damaging) on the Medvedev–Sponheuer–Karnik scale.

September 11 event 

This destructive earthquake occurred at 22:15 UTC and was recorded by several early seismographs. Near the epicentral region, fishermen reported disturbance of the sea, with tidal gauges recording  waves at Yevpatoria and  waves in Yalta.

Numerous, very large flames were seen offshore Sevastopol, Cape Lucullus, and Yalta in the early morning following the September event. Several types of fire and flame were described by witnesses. Other flames began with a whitish glow and became bright red; this style of flame sometimes burned for more than an hour. Bright flashes and explosions were also reported. The flames and explosions were attributed to methane or other hydrocarbon gasses that had been released from the seabed and spontaneously combusted in Phosphine (a self-igniting gas).

September 16 event 

An aftershock that was estimated to have a magnitude of 4.9 occurred on September 16 at 08:21 UTC. The shock was described as weak, but the sea receded at Balaklava Bay.

See also 
 1901 Black Sea earthquake
 List of earthquakes in 1927

References

External links 

1927 Crimean
Earthquakes
1927 in the Soviet Union
1927 Crimean
1927 earthquakes
Crimea
History of the Black Sea
Disasters in Crimea
1927 disasters in the Soviet Union